Michel Zucarelli (born 30 October 1953) is a French former cyclist. He competed in the individual and team pursuit events at the 1972 Summer Olympics.

References

External links
 

1953 births
Living people
French male cyclists
Olympic cyclists of France
Cyclists at the 1972 Summer Olympics
People from Montfermeil
French track cyclists
Sportspeople from Seine-Saint-Denis
Cyclists from Île-de-France
21st-century French people
20th-century French people